Sangama is an LGBT rights group based in Bangalore, India. When it began in 1999, Sangama acted as a documentation center but it has since grown to become an LGBT rights and HIV prevention NGO that mobilizes against sexual harassment and discrimination and conducts HIV prevention seminars and programmes. The organization works with both sex workers and LGBT people in Karnataka and Kerala.

History
Sangama was founded in 1999 by Manohar Elavarthi as a center that provided counseling services to sexual minorities and research materials to scholars of LGBT issues in the Bangalore region. The organization hosted discussions that attracted social activists and English speaking LGBT individuals. Over the years, the organization expanded its scope from providing counseling services, to providing HIV/AIDS information, supporting the rights of transgender people through rallies and mobilization and acting as safe drop-in for LGBT individuals in Karnataka. The organization's human rights focus has encouraged its attention to focus on non-English speaking Kothis and Hijra's from underprivileged communities in India who are at risk of HIV and abuse.

Activities

Liaison with community groups
Sangama works with a few organizations in an HIV prevention project called Lasyakairali Pehchan. The project provides support to community based organizations on strategies to prevent HIV/AIDS in their respective LGBT communities. Samara a community based organization that implements HIV/AIDS prevention programs in the Bangalore Urban District is an outgrowth of Sangama.

Outreach
Sangama established two outreach projects, one to reach gay individuals and the other to reach out to transgender people. Fieldworkers go to cruising joints to listen to problems faced by individuals and sex workers on the streets of Bangalore. The outreach programs helped Sangama gain more members for its drop-in sessions.

In conjunction with the Karnataka Sex Workers Union and Pedestrian Films, Sangama released a feature-length movie, Let the butterflies fly, in 2012. The movie was rejected at the Bangalore Film Festival but won an award at the Kashish Mumbai Festival.

Legal services
Sangama provides legal aid to sexual minorities who are abused and harassed by the police or charged with crimes due to their sexual orientation. Apart from legal services, the group also tracks police harassment and detention of LGBT individuals in Karnataka. In 2008, while going to a police station to support 5 hijras who were arrested, Sangama representatives were sent to another station where they were beaten. The organization continues to speak out about sexual discrimination and rights for transgender people in India.

References

LGBT culture in India
LGBT political advocacy groups in India
1999 establishments in Karnataka
Organizations established in 1999